Schermerhorn is a town in North Holland.

Schermerhorn may also refer to:

People
 Abraham Schermerhorn (1783–1850), a prominent American merchant in New York City
 Abraham M. Schermerhorn (1791-1855), US Representative from New York
 Alison Brie Schermerhorn, (born 1982), American actress
 Caroline Schermerhorn Astor (1830–1908), American socialite married to William Backhouse Astor, Jr.
 Charles Augustus Schermerhorn (1839–1914), an American real estate investor and insurance executive
 Edmund Schermerhorn (1815–1891), an American heir
 Eric Schermerhorn (born 1960), American guitarist and composer
 John F. Schermerhorn (1786–1851), American minister and missionary
 Kenneth Schermerhorn (1929–2005), American conductor and composer
 Peter Schermerhorn (1749-1826), merchant and ship owner
 Richard E. Schermerhorn (1927–1995), New York state senator
 Simon J. Schermerhorn (1827-1901), a United States Representative from New York
 Willem Schermerhorn (1894–1977), Dutch Prime Minister
 William Colford Schermerhorn (1821–1903), American attorney

Places in New York City
 Hoyt–Schermerhorn Streets station, Brooklyn, New York City
 Schermerhorn Building 376–380 Lafayette Street, New York City
 Schermerhorn Hall at Columbia University, New York City
 Schermerhorn Row Block, New York City

Other uses
 Schermerhorn–Drees cabinet, the cabinet of the Netherlands, 1945–1946
 Schermerhorn Symphony Center, a concert hall in Nashville, Tennessee